Olga Jakušina (born 26 May 1997) is a Latvian ice dancer. With Andrey Nevskiy, she is the 2015 Volvo Open Cup silver medalist and 2014 Tallinn Trophy bronze medalist. They have competed at three World Championships.

Career

Early years 
Jakušina began learning to skate in 2001. Around 2007, she teamed up with Ihar Ahai (also transcribed Igor Ogay) from Belarus. The two placed tenth on the novice level at the 2008 NRW Trophy.

Partnership with Grishin 
Around 2011, Jakušina teamed up with Russian-born Aleksandr Grishin. The duo debuted on the ISU Junior Grand Prix series in early September 2011. They placed 28th in the short dance at the 2013 World Junior Championships in Milan, Italy.

The Toruń Cup in January 2014 was their final international competition together. The two were coached by Alexander Zhulin, Oleg Volkov, and Gennadi Akkerman in Russia.

Partnership with Nevskiy 
In 2014, Jakušina teamed up with Russia's Andrey Nevskiy. They decided to train under Svetlana Alexeeva, Elena Kustarova, and Olga Riabinina in Moscow. After winning bronze at the Tallinn Trophy in December 2014, they placed 26th at the 2015 European Championships in Stockholm, Sweden, and 29th at the 2015 World Championships in Shanghai, China.

Jakušina/Nevskiy received the silver medal at the Volvo Open Cup in November 2015. They ranked 22nd at the 2016 European Championships in Bratislava, Slovakia, and 29th at the 2016 World Championships in Boston, United States.

The duo placed 23rd at the 2017 European Championships in Ostrava, Czech Republic, and 29th at the 2017 World Championships in Helsinki, Finland.

Following the 2016–2017 season, Jakušina/Nevskiy decided to be coached by Alexander Zhulin in Moscow.

Programs

With Nevskiy

With Grishin

Competitive highlights 
CS: Challenger Series; JGP: Junior Grand Prix

With Nevskiy

With Ahai and Grishin

References

External links 
 

1997 births
Latvian female ice dancers
Living people
Sportspeople from Jelgava